John Lawrence Givens (born August 29, 1992), known professionally as John Givez and sometimes Juan Dando, is an American musician, who plays hip hop, R&B, soul, funk and neo soul music. He is cousins with fellow rapper JGivens.  John has released two studio albums, Four Seasons in 2013, Soul Rebel in 2015, while both releases charted on the Billboard magazine charts.

Early life
Givens was born, John Lawrence Givens, on August 29, 1992, in Oceanside, California, where he grew up, the son of John Sr., and Ann Givens, while his parents are originally from Columbia, South Carolina.

Music career
John Givez music career started in 2013, with the studio album, Four Seasons, that was released on November 12, 2013, with Kings Dream Entertainment. The album was his breakthrough release upon the Billboard magazine charts, where it placed at No. 46 on the Gospel Albums chart. His subsequent studio album, Soul Rebel, was released on August 28, 2015, from Kings Dream Entertainment. This album charted on three Billboard magazine charts, where it placed on the Christian Albums chart at No. 7, Independent Albums chart at No. 19, and Rap Albums at No. 10.

He was also a member of the groups Cousin Neighbor (with JGivens) and Dream Junkies (with Beleaf and Ruslan). He was also featured on several songs on Asaiah Ziv's EP, Hipsavvy: The Introduction, which were Hipsavvy Cypher, Versace Dreams and Jumpman [After The Rain]. In 2016, John was featured on Lecrae's Church Clothes 3 track Misconceptions 3, in which he traded bars with Lecrae. In April 2016, John collaborated with the hardcore Christian rap group Hostyle Gospel to release a single titled Skittles & Iced Tea about the Trayvon Martin/George Zimmerman legal case.

In late 2016, Givez announced he had parted ways with his previous label, King's Dream Entertainment. In 2017, has since released the singles "2 dolla mic" and "Johnny's Cookout" as well as music videos for songs "a selfish demo" and "After hours".

On April 27, 2017, John announced he would be releasing a new mixtape during the summer titled "Side A".

On February 1, 2019, John released the EP titled "...To Jalisa"

Discography
Albums

Mixtapes

References

1992 births
Living people
African-American rappers
African-American Christians
21st-century American rappers
Rappers from San Diego
Musicians from San Diego
21st-century African-American musicians